1-hydroxy-2-naphthoate hydroxylase (1-hydroxy-2-naphthoic acid hydroxylase) is an enzyme with systematic name 1-hydroxy-2-naphthoate,NAD(P)H:oxygen oxidoreductase (2-hydroxylating, decarboxylating). This enzyme catalyses the following chemical reaction

 1-hydroxy-2-naphthoate + NAD(P)H + H+ + O2  1,2-dihydroxynaphthalene + NAD(P)+ + H2O + CO2

1-hydroxy-2-naphthoate hydroxylase is involved in chrysene degradation in some bacteria.

References

External links 
 

EC 1.14.13